James Seale is a writer, director and producer residing in Los Angeles.

Biography
Born in Philadelphia, Pennsylvania, Seale attended Temple University and New York University in their screenwriting and directing programs.

He wrote the action/comedy Mama's Boys for producer Joel Silver and Warner Bros. and his screenplay Tomorrow Man was purchased in a pre-emptive bid by producer Mario Kassar and Paramount Pictures. Seale has also written television pilots for NBC and producer Warren Littlefield.

Feature films
Seale's feature films include: 
Scorcher (2002)
Momentum (2003) 
Throttle (2005)
Juncture (2007)
Seale also directed the short film Post Traumatic, a top five finalist in the 2005 Amazon.com/Tribeca Short Film Competition.

References

External links

Living people
Artists from Philadelphia
American film directors
American male screenwriters
Temple University alumni
Tisch School of the Arts alumni
Year of birth missing (living people)